The Animal Medical Center of New York is a non profit animal hospital in New York City.

History
The center began in 1906 when Ellin Prince Speyer founded the "Women's Auxiliary to the American Society for the Prevention of Cruelty to Animals". The first major activity organized was the Work Horse Parade held on Memorial Day in 1907 in New York City.

In 1909 the Women's Auxiliary decided to establish a dispensary and out-patient clinic for all animals whose owners could not afford to pay for medical treatment. The clinic opened in 1910 on the Lower East Side of Manhattan. Veterinarians volunteered their services on a part-time basis. The clinic treated 6,028 animals in the first full year.

On May 12, 1910, the Women's Auxiliary separated from the Society for the Prevention of Cruelty to Animals and they incorporated themselves as the "New York Women's League for Animals".

The "Hospital of the New York Women's League for Animals" was established in 1914 at 350 Lafayette Street in New York City with Bruce Blair as the resident veterinarian. The hospital was renamed the Ellin Prince Speyer Free Hospital for Animals in 1921 after the death of the founder.

In 1959 the League voted to change the name to the "Animal Medical Center". In January 1960 construction began on a $4 million facility on 62nd Street on the East River. In 1962 it opened to the public.

References

External links
Official website of the Animal Medical Center
Hospital of the New York Women's League for Animals from the Library of Congress collection at Flickr Commons

1910 establishments in New York City
Animal charities based in the United States
Charities based in New York City
Non-profit organizations based in New York City
Veterinary hospitals
Hospital buildings completed in 1962
Veterinary medicine in the United States
Hospitals in New York City